The Eddie Logan Stakes is an American Thoroughbred horse race for two-year-olds run at the Santa Anita Park in Arcadia, California late in the year.  A Listed stakes, it's set at a distance of 1 mile on the turf, and currently offers a purse of $100,000 plus.

Begun in 2006, this race is named for Eddie Logan (May 20, 1910 - January 31, 2009), the "foot man," who worked at the track for 74 years, beginning on the track's opening day: December 24, 1934, shining shoes and cheering hearts. Logan was in the winner's circle to present the first winning trophy. 

This race was formerly known as the Hill Rise Stakes.  In 2002 Peace Rules won, with Singletary placing.

Past winners

 2015 - Path of David (Joseph Talamo)
 2014 - Bolo (Mike E. Smith)
 2013 - Enterprising 
 2012 - Avare
 2011 - Chips All In (Alonso Quinonez)
 2010 - Silver Medallion
 2009 - Macias (Victor Espinoza)
 2008 - Flashmans Papers (GB) (Rafael Bejarano)
 2007 - Yankee Bravo (Alex Solis)
 2006 - Kolo (Jose Valdivia, Jr.)

As the Hill Rise Stakes

 2005 - Chattahoochee War    (Rafael Bejarano)
 2004 - Objective
 2003 - 
 2002 - Peace Rules    (Victor Espinoza)
 2001 - Jamaican Rum
 2000 - The Deputy
 1998 - Ladies Din (multiple Grade I stakes winner)
 1997 - Greed is Good
 1996 - Al Mamoon (multiple graded stakes winner)

References
 Santa Anita Park Official Website
 Santa Anita honors Eddie Logan

Turf races in the United States
Horse races in California
Ungraded stakes races in the United States
Recurring sporting events established in 2006
Santa Anita Park
2006 establishments in California